Joshua Hughes Paul (20 January 1863 - 6 March 1939) was a Mormon university president, newspaper editor and Latter-Day Saints missionary. Born in Salt Lake City, Utah, to Mormon pioneer James Patten Paul and Elizabeth Evans, the stepfather and mother of Martha Hughes Cannon, JH Paul as a boy herded cows for Mormon President Brigham Young. After learning carpentry from his father, he worked at the Salt Lake Brewery before entering the Latter-day Saints University in the same city, but, as no degrees were awarded at the former at that time, he had to continue his studies at Illinois Wesleyan University, where he graduated in 1905.

University career

After graduation, Joshua Hughes Paul became an instructor and later professor at the University of Utah. From 1891 to 1894, he was President of the Brigham Young College (later Brigham Young University, at Logan, Utah, where he contributed greatly to growth of the institution; President of the Agricultural College of Utah (now Utah State University) from 1895 to 1897; President of the Latter Day Saints College from 1899 to 1926, and then a teacher at the University of Utah until 1926.

Newspaper editor

In 1890, Professor Paul was associate editor of the Salt Lake Herald, and in 1900 he briefly worked in the same position at the Deseret News.

Other activities

In 1928 and 1930, Paul ran for Congress as a Democratic nominee.

Between 1929 and 1932, Paul was in charge of old-age pensions in Salt Lake City.

References

1863 births
1939 deaths
University of Utah faculty
Brigham Young University faculty
Illinois Wesleyan University alumni
People from Salt Lake City
Utah State University faculty
Utah Democrats